Pen painting is a painting technique used by seventeenth-century artists from the Dutch Republic. First the artist grounds a canvas with white oil paint before drawing on it with blue India ink. The invention of the technique is commonly attributed to Willem van de Velde the Elder.

References

Painting techniques